Virginia Beach Friends School (VBFS) is an independent life-skills and college preparatory day school founded in 1955 under the care of the Virginia Beach Friends Meeting.  Virginia Beach Friends School has more than 100 students enrolled in three divisions – Early School (Cottage, Treehouse, Pre-K and Kindergarten), Lower School (Grades 1-5), and Middle School (Grades 6-8). 

It formerly operated a high school, but the high school closed in 2021.

References

Schools in Virginia Beach, Virginia
Private elementary schools in Virginia
Private middle schools in Virginia
Private K–8 schools in the United States
Private K-12 schools in Virginia
Preparatory schools in Virginia
Quaker schools in Virginia